Dadra is associated with the Hindustani classical music of the Indian subcontinent.

Dadra may also refer to:
 Dadra, Jaunpur, a village in Uttar Prahesh, India
 Dadra and Nagar Haveli, a district in western India
 Dadra, Dadra and Nagar Haveli and Daman and Diu, a small town in Dadra and Nagar Haveli District
 Dadra and Nagar Haveli (Lok Sabha constituency), a parliamentary constituency in the union territory of Dadra and Nagar Haveli and Daman and Diu